Michael Jones (July 5, 1865 – March 24, 1894) was a Major League Baseball pitcher. He also had four hits and two walks in his eleven career plate appearances.

Sources

1865 births
1894 deaths
19th-century baseball players
Canadian expatriate baseball players in the United States
Major League Baseball pitchers
Louisville Colonels players
Guelph Maple Leafs players
Hamilton Primrose players
Hamilton Clippers players
Hamilton Hams players
London Tecumsehs (baseball) players
Major League Baseball players from Canada
Baseball players from Hamilton, Ontario